Spook Ranch is a 1925 American silent Western film directed by Edward Laemmle (Carl Laemmle's nephew) and starring Hoot Gibson. It was produced and distributed by Universal Pictures. The film featured white actor Ed Cowles in blackface playing Hoot Gibson's black sidekick, George Washington Black.

Universal Pictures founder Carl Laemmle persuaded his nephew Edward to enter the family business in 1915, after which he specialized mostly in directing westerns. Actress Helen Ferguson retired from acting in 1930 and became a Hollywood publicist. Hoot Gibson enjoyed a sensational career as a major Western star in the 1920s and early 1930s, but wound up dying penniless in 1962, from cancer.

Plot
In a small mining town in the West, the sheriff orders a cowboy named Bill Bangs (Hoot Gibson) and his Negro sidekick to investigate a haunted ranch. They discover that the ranch is not haunted, but rather is inhabited by a gang of criminals who have kidnapped the ranch owner's daughter to ransom her for her father's gold. The cowboy defeats the gang and winds up with the girl.

Cast
 Hoot Gibson as Bill Bangs
 Jules Cowles (credited as Ed Cowles) as George Washington Black 
 Tote Du Crow as Navarro
 Helen Ferguson as Elvira
 Robert McKim as Don Ramies, chief villain
 Frank Rice as the Sheriff
 Dick Sutherland  (uncredited)

Preservation status
This film is preserved in the Museum of Modern Art and Filmoteca de Catalunya, Barcelona.

References

External links

 
 

1925 films
Universal Pictures films
1925 Western (genre) films
Films directed by Edward Laemmle
Films set in mining communities
American black-and-white films
Silent American Western (genre) films
1920s American films
1920s English-language films